Stray Horse Creek is a stream in the U.S. state of South Dakota. It was named for an incident when surveyors' horses escaped and were later found alive and well at the creek.

See also
List of rivers of South Dakota

References

Rivers of Codington County, South Dakota
Rivers of Deuel County, South Dakota
Rivers of Hamlin County, South Dakota
Rivers of South Dakota